Chamku is a 2008 Indian action thriller film written and directed by Kabeer Kaushik. It stars Bobby Deol in the eponymous role. It also co-stars Priyanka Chopra and Irrfan Khan. Riteish Deshmukh and Danny Denzongpa appear in supporting roles. The film was released worldwide on 29 August 29 2008.

Plot
The film tells the story of Chandrama Singh, who was raised by Baba, a Naxal leader based in the southern interiors of Bihar, after his family was brutally murdered. He later gets picked up under a covert Governmental program jointly conceived by RAW and Intelligence Bureau to carry out political assassinations. He falls in love with Shubhi, a kindergarten teacher, and decides to lead a reformed life but a chanced encounter entangles him in the world of crime once again.

Cast
Irrfan Khan as Vishal Kapoor
Priyanka Chopra as Shurbhi Gupta
Bobby Deol as Chandrama "Chamku" Singh
Ritesh Deshmukh as Arjun Tiwari
Danny Denzongpa as Baba
Rajpal Yadav as Hussain Ahmed
Arya Babbar as Shreedhar
Akhilendra Mishra as Thakur Mahendra Pratap Singh
Rachna Khanna as Subhi Friend

Production
Kabeer Kaushik, the director of the film had approached Bobby Deol to play the lead role in his debut film, Sehar, which was eventually played by Arshad Warsi. Despite liking the script Deol turned it down because he was not prepared to work with a debutant director and also felt that the plot was similar to some other film. The song "Gola Gola" from the film picturised on the festival of Holi was released exclusively on radio stations on 21 March 2008, to coincide with the festival of Holi.  Rosa Catalano features in a dance number in the film titled Trance.

Soundtrack
Monty Sharma has composed the soundtrack for the movie, and the lyrics have been written by Sameer. The soundtrack was released on 29 July 2008 under the label of T-Series.

Reception
Taran Adarsh of IndiaFM gave the film 1.5 stars out of 5, writing ″On the whole, CHAMKU rests on an outdated plot and given the blood-gore-brutality in the film, will face an uphill task. Businesswise, it has some chances in the U.P.-Bihar region.″ Sukanya Verma of Rediff.com gave the film 1 star out of 5, writing ″director Kabeer Kaushik disappoints big time. It seems like Sehar and Chamku were directed by two different entities. His work here is utterly amateurish and rushed-up. The screenplay is shoddy whereas the dialogues are an excuse for mandatory exchange (which by the way are so sluggish in temperament they scream for a pair of scissors).″ Gaurav Malani of The Economic Times gave the film 1 star out of 5, writing ″Bobby Deol carries the same jaded expression throughout the film. For Riteish Deshmukh, its clearly one of those films that you do as a favour for industry friends. Priyanka Chopra substantiates how worthless heroines are to male-centric cinema. Irrfan Khan shows more screen presence in his 20-second Vodafone commercials. Arya Babbar is relegated to the rank of a junior artist. Danny dies before you notice him. Alas, Chamku fails to shine. Rather it bears the blemish of an outdated 70s revenge drama.

References

External links
 

2008 crime drama films
2000s Hindi-language films
2008 films
Indian crime action films
Films about Naxalism
Films shot in Bihar
Films shot in Mumbai
Indian crime thriller films
2000s spy action films
Films about the Research and Analysis Wing
Vijayta Films films
Indian action thriller films
Films set in Bihar
Films about mass murder
Indian films about revenge
2008 crime thriller films
2000s crime action films